Jan Luca Schuler (born 22 March 1999) is a German professional footballer who plays as a forward for 1. FC Magdeburg.

Career
Schuler began playing football at the age of 3 with Niederkirchen, and continued his development at the youth academies of Meckenheim, 1. FC Kaiserslautern, SV Elversberg, and 1. FC Saarbrücken. He signed his first professional contract with 1. FC Köln II in March 2018.

Schuler made his professional debut for Schalke 04 in the Bundesliga on 28 November 2020, coming on as a substitute in the 81st minute for Matthew Hoppe against Borussia Mönchengladbach. The away match finished as a 4–1 loss.

References

External links
 
 
 
 

1999 births
Living people
People from Neustadt an der Weinstraße
German footballers
Footballers from Rhineland-Palatinate
Association football forwards
1. FC Saarbrücken players
1. FC Köln II players
FC Schalke 04 II players
FC Schalke 04 players
1. FC Magdeburg players
Bundesliga players
2. Bundesliga players
Regionalliga players